Women's trampoline competition at the 2010 Summer Youth Olympics was held on 20 August at the Bishan Sports Hall.
The competition consisted of two rounds. In the first round, each trampolinist performed two routines on the trampoline. One routine had to include required elements, while the other was a voluntary routine. Scores were given for both execution and difficulty in each routine, summed to give a routine score. The two routine scores in the first round determined qualification for the second; the eight top finishers moved on to the final. The final consisted entirely of a single voluntary routine, with no preliminary scores being carried over.

Medalists

Qualification

Final

References
 Qualification
 Women's Trampoline Final Results

Gymnastics at the 2010 Summer Youth Olympics
Women's sports competitions in Singapore
2010 in women's gymnastics